Behrmann is a German surname. Notable people with the surname include:

Lazar Behrmann (1830–1893), Russian educator and editor
Marlene Behrmann (born 1959), American psychologist
Michael Behrmann (born 1966), German field hockey coach
Walter Behrmann (1882–1955), German geographer

See also
Behrmann projection
Behrman

German-language surnames